Eccopsis nebulana is a moth of the family Tortricidae. It is found in central, southern and eastern Africa, including the Seychelles.

References

Walsingham, Thomas de Grey 1891a. African Micro-Lepidoptera. - Transactions of the entomological Society of London 1891(1):63–132, pls. 3–7

External links
Westafricanlepidoptera.com: Pictures of Eccopsis nebulana

Moths described in 1891
Olethreutini
Moths of Africa
Moths of Seychelles